Tadeusz Rittner (pseudonym: Tomasz Czaszka; May 31, 1873 – June 19, 1921) was a Polish dramatist, prose writer, and literary critic.

Rittner was born in Lemberg, Austro-Hungarian Empire.

Sources
 Austria Encyclopedia

19th-century Polish dramatists and playwrights
20th-century Polish dramatists and playwrights
Polish male dramatists and playwrights
1873 births
1921 deaths
Polish writers in German